The Kantonsschule Solothurn is a gymnasium in the municipality of Solothurn, Switzerland. With approximately  1,800 students (stand: 2007) it is among the biggest schools in Switzerland. The current principal is Stefan Zumbrunn-Würsch.

Structure 
The Kantonsschule of Solothurn is divided into

the Maturitätsschule, which offers a Scientific Profile, a Physical Education Profile, an Economic & Law Profile, an Art Profile and  a Linguistic Profile. It is a four year school and students normally start at the age of 15.
the Fachmittelschule (social, education and health), which takes three years to graduate. Normally, students start at the age of 16.
the Sek P also called Untergymnasium (preparation for the Maturitätsschule), which is currently three years long and will drop to two years starting next school year 2011/12. Students start at the age of 11 or 12.

Other 
 Media library with 30,000 books, encyclopaedias, dictionaries, videos, DVDs, CDs, magazines, cassettes, paperbacks and novels
 Cafeteria, which is operated by the "nonprofit women's organization" on behalf of the Canton
 60 free courses (very high amount for a Kantonsschule)

Notable Professors 
 Hermann Breitenbach
 Hans Rudolf Breitenbach
 Urs Joseph Flury
 Franz Joseph Hugi
 Franz Misteli
 Gaudenz Taverna

Notable alumni
 Karl Arnold-Obrist (1796–1862), Roman Catholic Bishop in Diocese of Basel.
 Friedrich Fiala (1817–1888), historian and Roman Catholic bishop in the diocese of Basel
 Robert Glutz von Blotzheim (1786–1818), writer and journalist
 Urs Glutz von Blotzheim (1751–1816), officer and politician
 Werner Ingold (1919-1995), pioneer in the field of chemical microanalysis and entrepreneur in the commercialization of pH electrodes
 Benedikt Weibel (born 1946), former CEO of the Swiss Federal Railways
 Samuel Schmid (born 1947), former member of the Swiss Federal Council (2001–2008) and former President of the Swiss Confederation (2005)
 Carla Stampfli (born 1984), professional swimmer with several Swiss records and participation in the Olympic Games in Athens 2004

References

External links 
 Official School Page

Buildings and structures in the canton of Solothurn
Gymnasiums in Switzerland